The 17th Annual Grammy Awards were presented March 1, 1975, and were broadcast live on American television. They recognized accomplishments by musicians from the year 1974.

Award winners 

Record of the Year
John Farrar (producer) & Olivia Newton-John for "I Honestly Love You" (award presented by John Lennon and Paul Simon and accepted by Art Garfunkel)
Album of the Year
Stevie Wonder (producer & artist) for Fulfillingness' First Finale
Song of the Year
Alan and Marilyn Bergman & Marvin Hamlisch (songwriters) for "The Way We Were" performed by Barbra Streisand
Best New Artist
Marvin Hamlisch

Children's

Best Recording for Children
Sebastian Cabot, Sterling Holloway & Paul Winchell for Winnie the Pooh and Tigger Too

Classical

Best Classical Performance - Orchestra
Georg Solti (conductor) & the Chicago Symphony Orchestra for Berlioz: Symphonie Fantastique
Best Classical Vocal Soloist Performance
Leontyne Price for Leontyne Price Sings Richard Strauss
Best Opera Recording
Richard Mohr (producer), Georg Solti (conductor), Judith Blegen, Montserrat Caballé, Plácido Domingo, Sherrill Milnes, Ruggero Raimondi  & the London Philharmonic for Puccini: La Bohème
Best Choral Performance, Classical (other than opera)
Colin Davis (conductor) the Ambrosian Singers, the Wandsworth School Boys Choir & the London Symphony Orchestra & Chorus for Berlioz: The Damnation of Faust
 Best Classical Performance Instrumental Soloist or Soloists (with orchestra)
Maxim Shostakovich (conductor), David Oistrakh & the New Philharmonia for Shostakovich: Violin Concerto No. 1
Best Classical Performance Instrumental Soloist or Soloists (without orchestra)
Alicia de Larrocha for Albéniz: Iberia
Best Chamber Music Performance
Pierre Fournier, Arthur Rubinstein & Henryk Szeryng for Brahms: Trios (Complete)/Schumann: Trio No. 1 in D Minor
Album of the Year, Classical
David Harvey (producer), Georg Solti (conductor) & the Chicago Symphony Orchestra for Berlioz: Symphonie Fantastique

Comedy

Best Comedy Recording
Richard Pryor for That Nigger's Crazy

Composing and arranging

Best Instrumental Composition
Mike Oldfield (composer) for "Tubular Bells - Theme From The Exorcist"
Album of Best Original Score Written for a Motion Picture or a Television Special
Alan and Marilyn Bergman & Marvin Hamlisch (composers) for The Way We Were performed by Barbra Streisand
Best Instrumental Arrangement
Patrick Williams (arranger) for Threshold
Best Arrangement Accompanying Vocalists
Joni Mitchell & Tom Scott (arrangers) for "Down to You" performed by Joni Mitchell

Country

Best Country Vocal Performance, Female
Anne Murray for Love Song
Best Country Vocal Performance, Male
Ronnie Milsap for "Please Don't Tell Me How the Story Ends"
Best Country Vocal Performance by a Duo or Group
The Pointer Sisters for "Fairytale"
Best Country Instrumental Performance
Chet Atkins & Merle Travis for The Atkins-Travis Traveling Show
Best Country Song
Billy Sherrill & Norro Wilson (songwriters) for "A Very Special Love Song" performed by Charlie Rich

Folk

Best Ethnic or Traditional Recording
Doc Watson & Merle Watson for Two Days in November

Gospel

Best Gospel Performance
The Oak Ridge Boys for "The Baptism of Jesse Taylor"
Best Soul Gospel Performance
James Cleveland for In the Ghetto performed by James Cleveland & the Southern California Community Choir
Best Inspirational Performance (non-classical)
Elvis Presley for How Great Thou Art

Jazz

Best Jazz Performance by a Soloist
Charlie Parker for First Recordings!
Best Jazz Performance by a Group
Joe Pass, Niels-Henning Ørsted Pedersen & Oscar Peterson for The Trio
Best Jazz Performance by a Big Band
Woody Herman for Thundering Herd

Musical show

Best Score From the Original Cast Show Album
Robert Brittan, Judd Woldin (composers), Thomas Z. Shepard (producer) & the original cast (Virginia Capers, Joe Morton, Ernestine Jackson, Robert Jackson, Deborah Allen & Helen Martin) for Raisin

Packaging and notes

Best Album Package
Christopher Whorf & Ed Thrasher (art directors) for Come and Gone performed by Mason Proffit
Best Album Notes
Charles R. Townsend (notes writer) for For the Last Time performed by Bob Wills & His Texas Playboys
Dan Morgenstern (notes writer) for The Hawk Flies performed by Coleman Hawkins
Best Album Notes - Classical
Angus Scrimm (as Rory Guy) (notes writer) for Korngold: The Classic Erich Wolfgang Korngold conducted by Ulf Hoelscher/Willy Mattes

Pop

Best Pop Vocal Performance, Female
Olivia Newton-John for "I Honestly Love You"
Best Pop Vocal Performance, Male
Stevie Wonder for Fulfillingness' First Finale
Best Pop Vocal Performance by a Duo, Group or Chorus
Paul McCartney & Wings for "Band on the Run"
Best Pop Instrumental Performance
Marvin Hamlisch for "The Entertainer"

Production and engineering

Best Engineered Recording, Non-Classical
Geoff E. Emerick (engineer) for Band on the Run performed by Paul McCartney & Wings
Best Engineered Recording, Classical
Kenneth Wilkinson (engineer), Georg Solti (conductor) & the Chicago Symphony Orchestra for Berlioz: Symphonie Fantastique
Best Producer of the Year
Thom Bell

R&B

Best R&B Vocal Performance, Female
Aretha Franklin for "Ain't Nothing Like the Real Thing"
Best R&B Vocal Performance, Male
Stevie Wonder for "Boogie on Reggae Woman"
Best R&B Vocal Performance by a Duo, Group or Chorus
Rufus for "Tell Me Something Good"
Best R&B Instrumental Performance
MFSB for "The Sound of Philadelphia"
Best Rhythm & Blues Song
Stevie Wonder (songwriter) for "Living for the City"

Spoken

Best Spoken Word Recording
Peter Cook & Dudley Moore for Good Evening

References

External links
17th Grammy Awards at the Internet Movie Database

 017
1975 music awards
1975 in New York City
1975 in American music
Grammy
March 1975 events in the United States
1970s in Manhattan